Cain Magnus Dotson (born 17 October 1971) is a Swedish former professional footballer who played as a forward.

Career 
Dotson was born in Haninge. He represented IF Brommapojkarna and GIF Sundsvall during a career that spanned between 1989 and 2004. A youth international between 1987 and 1988, he won eight caps and scored one goal for the Sweden U17 team.

References 

1971 births
Living people
Swedish footballers
Allsvenskan players
Association football forwards
GIF Sundsvall players
IF Brommapojkarna players
People from Haninge Municipality
Sportspeople from Stockholm County